Patrick Hunt may refer to:

 Patrick Hunt (archeologist) (born 1951), American archeologist and author
 Patrick Hunt (basketball coach), Australian basketball coach
 Patrick Hunt (footballer), Scottish footballer
 G. Patrick Hunt (born 1949), Canadian politician in the Nova Scotia House of Assembly